Alberto Moioli, (Monza February 19, 1968), is an Italian art critic and writer, editorial director of the Enciclopedia d'arte italiana from 2012 to 2023.

Research and curation 
Moioli has placed a particular emphasis on the work of Italian painters from modern and contemporary art, was born as a journalist since 2003, become a member of A.I.C.A. International Association of Art Critics since 2016. He is the curator of numerous contemporary exhibitions but also as editorial curator of the Enciclopedia d'arte italiana of Milan. Since 2019 he has collaborates with the Archivio Paolo Salvati organ of association Paolo Salvati Onlus.

Works 

 Enciclopedia d’Arte Italiana, General catalog of artists from 900 to today, n.1, Milan, 2012.
 Enciclopedia d’Arte Italiana, General catalog of artists from 900 to today, n.2, Milan, 2013.
 Enciclopedia d’Arte Italiana, General catalog of artists from 900 to today, n.3, Milan, 2014.
 Enciclopedia d’Arte Italiana, General catalog of artists from 900 to today, n.4, Milan, 2015.
 Enciclopedia d’Arte Italiana, General catalog of artists from 900 to today, n.5, Milan, 2016.
 Enciclopedia d’Arte Italiana, General catalog of artists from 900 to today, n.6, Milan, 2017..
 Enciclopedia d’Arte Italiana, General catalog of artists from 900 to today, n.7, Milan, 2018.
 Enciclopedia d’Arte Italiana, General catalog of artists from 900 to today, n.8, Milan, 2019.
 Enciclopedia d’Arte Italiana, General catalog of artists from 900 to today, n.9, Milan, 2020..
 Enciclopedia d’Arte Italiana, General catalog of artists from 900 to today, n.9 (bis), Milan, 2021..

References

External links 

1968 births
Living people
Italian art critics
Art exhibitions in Italy
Italian art curators